Ronaldo Vieira may refer to

 Ronaldo Vieira (Brazilian footballer) (born 1990), footballer currently playing for the Fort Lauderdale Strikers
 Ronaldo Vieira (footballer, born 1998) Guinea-Bissau-born English footballer currently playing for U.C. Sampdoria